Kevin Huw Phillips (born 15 June 1961) is a former Wales international rugby union player.

A hooker, he played club rugby for Neath RFC. Phillips also captained the Welsh national team for two matches in the 1990 season, winning both games.

At the start of the 2010–11 season, he became the coach of the Crymych RFC youth team.

References

1961 births
Living people
Neath RFC players
Rugby union players from Pembrokeshire
Wales international rugby union players
Wales rugby union captains
Welsh rugby union players
Rugby union hookers